Peston on Sunday was the flagship political discussion programme on British television network ITV, which was broadcast live on Sunday mornings from 10 am and rebroadcast after the ITV Weekend News on Sunday evening. The programme was presented by Robert Peston, the Political Editor of ITV News, and featured discussions with politicians and public figures on the major news events of the week alongside analysis and social media reaction.

ITV announced on 5 June 2018 that the show would resume in the autumn of 2018 and would be broadcast after the ITV News at Ten on Wednesday nights. The show was rebranded under the new name of Peston, and the show is now broadcast from TC2 at BBC Studioworks' Television Centre. The revamped show began in September 2018.

Format
As a Sunday morning talk show, in contrast to the style of questioning employed by rival programmes like The Andrew Marr Show and Sophy Ridge on Sunday, Peston on Sunday featured a more relaxed, conversational approach to engage and explore the opinions of the political guests.

The programme was usually broadcast live from The London Studios, where it shared Studio 3 with Lorraine and Loose Women. Episodes were broadcast from Liverpool, Birmingham, Brighton, Manchester and Glasgow during the party conference seasons of 2016 and 2017.

Episodes

Run 1
It was confirmed on 5 May 2016 that Chancellor of the Exchequer George Osborne would be one of the studio guests on the launch episode of Peston on Sunday with the first run leading in to and dealing with the immediate aftermath of the EU Referendum.

Run 2

The second run of Peston on Sunday began on 18 September 2016.

Run 3 
The third run launched on 15 January 2017, with minor set changes.

Run 4 
The fourth run launched on 23 April 2017, the week after Prime Minister Theresa May called a snap general election to be held on Thursday, 8 June 2017.

Run 5

Run 6
Returned on 14 January 2018

Run 7
Returned on 15 April 2018.

References

External links
Peston on Twitter

2016 British television series debuts
2018 British television series endings
2010s British television talk shows
English-language television shows
ITV news shows
Sunday morning talk shows